Guy Million (22 May 1932 – 4 May 2004) was a French racing cyclist. He finished in last place in the 1957 Tour de France.

References

External links
 

1932 births
2004 deaths
French male cyclists
Sportspeople from Colombes
Cyclists from Île-de-France